Scopula glaucescens is a moth of the family Geometridae. It was described by Claude Herbulot in 1978. It is endemic to Madagascar.

References

Moths described in 1978
Moths of Madagascar
glaucescens
Taxa named by Claude Herbulot